Annemarie Huber-Hotz (16 August 1948 – 1 August 2019) was a Swiss politician who served as the  Federal Chancellor of Switzerland between 2000 and 2007.  She was nominated by the FDP for the office, and elected to it on 15 December 1999.  In 2011, she became President of the Swiss Red Cross and ex officio vice-president of the IFRC.

Biography 
Born in Baar, Zug, Huber-Hotz attended primary and secondary school in Baar, and the Gymnasium of Zug. She then studied sociology, ethnology and political science at the Universities of Bern, Uppsala (Sweden) and at the Graduate Institute of International Studies in Geneva and participated in various professional activities. She undertook advanced studies at ETH in Zürich in spatial planning.

She held the following positions:
 1976-1977: Studied spatial planning in Zug canton
 1978-1981: Worked for the General Secretariat of the Swiss Parliament, in the press service
 1981-1992: Worked for the secretariat of the Swiss Council of States
 1989-1992: Director of the scientific parliamentary service
 1992-1999: General Secretary of the Swiss Parliament
 2000-2007: Federal Chancellor
 2011- 2019: President, Swiss Red Cross

The Federal Chancellery, with about 180 workers, performs administrative functions relating to the co-ordination of the Swiss Federal government and the work of the Swiss Federal Council. The Chancellor is assisted by Vice-Chancellors and attends meetings of the Federal Council but does not vote. Huber-Hotz did not stand for reelection in December 2007 (after the general election), and was succeeded by Corina Casanova on 1 January 2008.

Huber-Hotz was married and had 3 children. She spoke English, French and Swedish in addition to German and Swiss German. Huber-Hotz died on 1 August 2019 at the age of 70 from a heart attack.

References

External links
 Federal Chancellery biography (in French, German, and Italian)

Federal Chancellors of Switzerland
1948 births
2019 deaths
Free Democratic Party of Switzerland politicians
Graduate Institute of International and Development Studies alumni
20th-century Swiss women politicians
20th-century Swiss politicians
21st-century Swiss women politicians
21st-century Swiss politicians
University of Bern alumni